The Difficult Couple, also translated as Die for Marriage, is a 1913 Chinese film. It is known for being the earliest Chinese feature film. Although it had a dialogue of only a little more than 1,000 characters, it was the first Chinese film with a script. It is considered a lost film.

Plot

The story is mainly about a man and a woman whom previously never met each other, being forced to marry for the benefits of their families' relationships, despite their own personal aspirations.

See also
Cinema of China

References

1913 films
Chinese silent films
Lost Chinese films
Chinese black-and-white films
1913 lost films